The Faculty of Chemistry and Pharmacy, formerly the "Faculty of Chemistry", is a college of St. Kliment Ohridski University of Sofia, Bulgaria. It was renamed by a decision of the National Assembly of Bulgaria on February 24, 2012.

Staff 
Vassya Bankova

References

External links
 Official website.

Sofia University